The Poacher may refer to:
 The Poacher (1926 film), a German silent drama film
 The Poacher (1953 film), an Austrian-German drama film

See  also
 Poacher (disambiguation)